In heraldry, a bar is an ordinary consisting of a horizontal band across the shield. If only one bar appears across the middle of the shield, it is termed a fess; if two or more appear, they can only be called bars. Calling the bar a diminutive of the fess is inaccurate, however, because two bars may each be no smaller than a fess. Like the fess, bars too may bear complex lines (such as embattled, indented, nebuly, etc.). The diminutive form of the bar (narrower than a bar yet wider than a cottise) is the barrulet, though these frequently appear in pairs, the pair termed a "bar gemel" rather than "two barrulets".

Common ordinaries
A single bar placed across the top of the field is called a chief. A single bar placed over the center of the field is called a fess. Two to four of these appearing on a shield are called bars, and more than four are called barrulets.

Diminutives
Thin bars are termed barrulets. A still thinner bar or riband is known as a cottise. Cottises never appear alone and have no direction of their own, but are borne on each side of an ordinary (such as a fess, pale, bend or chevron). The ordinary thus accompanied by a cottise on each side is then described as "cottised", or these may even be "doubly cottised" (i.e. surrounded by four cottises, two along each side).

The "closet" is described as a band of the thickness between a bar and a barrulet, but is rarely found.

A bar that has been "couped" (cut) at the ends so as not to reach the edges of the field is called a hamade, hamaide or hummet, after the town of La Hamaide in Hainaut, Belgium. As a charge, it is almost always depicted in threes. The adjective is hummety.

Barry and barruly
A field divided by many bars — often six, eight or ten parts with two alternating tinctures — is described as barry (of x, y and z, where x is the number of bars, y is the first (uppermost) tincture, and z is the second tincture). A field divided into five, seven or nine parts with two alternating tinctures is not called barry, however, but two, three or four bars. A barry design consisting of ten or more parts is comparatively rare and is called barruly rather than barry.

Examples

References

 

Heraldic ordinaries